Argentina has had many different types of heads of state, as well as many different types of government. During pre-Columbian times, most of the territories that today form Argentina were inhabited by Amerindian peoples without any centralized government, with the exception of the Inca subjects of the Northwest and Cuyo regions. During the Spanish colonization of the Americas, the King of Spain retained the ultimate authority over the territories conquered in the New World, appointing viceroys for local government. The territories that would later become Argentina were first part of the Viceroyalty of Peru and then the Viceroyalty of the Río de la Plata. The May Revolution started the Argentine War of Independence by replacing the viceroy Baltasar Hidalgo de Cisneros with the first national government. It was the Primera Junta, a junta of several members, which would grow into the Junta Grande with the incorporation of provincial deputies. The size of the juntas gave room to internal political disputes among their members, so they were replaced by the First and Second Triumvirate, of three members. The Assembly of the Year XIII created a new executive authority, with attributions similar to that of a head of state, called the Supreme Director of the United Provinces of the Río de la Plata. A second Assembly, the Congress of Tucumán, declared independence in 1816 and promulgated the Argentine Constitution of 1819. However, this constitution was repealed during armed conflicts between the central government and the Federal League Provinces. This started a period known as the Anarchy of the Year XX, when Argentina lacked any type of head of state.

There was a new attempt to organize a central government in 1826. A new congress wrote a new constitution and elected Bernardino Rivadavia as president in the process. Rivadavia was the first President of Argentina. However, he resigned shortly after and the 1826 Constitution was repealed. The Argentine provinces then organized themselves as a confederation without a central head of state. In this organization, the governors of Buenos Aires province took some duties such as the payment of external debt or the administration of the foreign relations in the name of all provinces. Those governors were appointed by the Buenos Aires legislature, with the only exception of Juan Lavalle. Juan Manuel de Rosas kept the governor office for seventeen consecutive years until Justo José de Urquiza defeated him at the 1852 Battle of Caseros. Urquiza then called for a new Constitutional Assembly and promulgated the Argentine Constitution of 1853, which is the current Constitution of Argentina through amendments. In 1854, Urquiza became the first President of modern Argentina, acting both as head of government and head of state. However, the Buenos Aires Province had rejected the Constitution and became an independent state until the aftermath of the 1859 Battle of Cepeda, although the internecine conflict continued. Only after the subsequent Battle of Pavón in 1861, the former bonaerense leader Bartolomé Mitre became the first president of an unified Argentine Republic.

The succession line of constitutional presidents run uninterrupted until 1930, when José Félix Uriburu took government through a civic-military coup d'état. For many decades, there was an alternance between legitimate presidents and others that took government through illegitimate means. Those means included coups d'état, but also proscriptions of major political parties and electoral fraud. The last coup d'état occurred in 1976 and resulted in the National Reorganization Process, which ended in 1983. The retrospective recognition as presidents or heads of state of any de facto ruler that exercised its authority outside the Constitutional mandate is a controversial and relevant issue in Argentine politics. However, their government actions were recognized as valid following the de facto government doctrine that used to legitimize them. This doctrine was rejected by the 1994 amendment and would not be applicable for potential future coups. The current head of state is President Alberto Fernandez, who took office on 10 December 2019.

Affiliation keys

United Provinces of the Rio de la Plata (1810–1831)

Junta presidents (1810–1811)

Triumvirates (1811–1814)

Supreme Directors (1814–1820)

Governors of Buenos Aires Province managing international relations (1820–1826) 

Between 1820 and 1826, the United Provinces functioned as a loose alliance of autonomous provinces put together by pacts and treaties (see Treaty of Pilar, Treaty of Benegas, Quadrilateral Treaty), but lacking any actual central government until the 1825 Constitutional Congress.

First presidential government (1826–1827)

Governors of Buenos Aires Province managing international relations (1827–1831)

Argentine Confederation (1831–1861)

Governors managing international relations (1831–1852)

Provisional Director of the Argentine Confederation (1852–1854)

Presidents of the Confederation (1854–1861)

Argentine Republic (1861–present)

Presidents (1861–present)

Timeline of head of states of Argentina by affiliation

Timeline of head of states of Argentina by individual

See also 
President of Argentina
Politics of Argentina
List of vice presidents of Argentina
Lists of incumbents

References

Notes

Bibliography

External links
 Rulers.org — Argentina list of rulers for Argentina

Argentina

Presidents